Novoyashevo (Yañı Yäş) is a rural locality (a village) in Staroyashevsky Selsoviet, Kaltasinsky District, Bashkortostan, Russia. The population was 143 as of 2010. There are 5 streets.

Geography 
Novoyashevo is located 41 km east of Kaltasy (the district's administrative centre) by road. Staroyashevo is the nearest rural locality.

References 

Rural localities in Kaltasinsky District